Stříbrný vítr is a lyrical novel by Fráňa Šrámek.

Publication history
Šrámek released the first version of the novel in 1910. The definitive reworked version was released in 1920.

Adaptation
A film adaptation Silvery Wind was made in 1954 by Václav Krška.

References

1920 Czech novels
1920s novels
20th-century Czech novels
Czech novels adapted into films
Modernist novels